is a Japanese animator, storyboard artist, and director.

Filmography

Television series

Films

References

External links
 
 

Anime directors
Living people
Year of birth missing (living people)